Igor Nikolayevich Kovalevich (born 3 February 1968) is a Belarusian professional football coach and former player. Since 2016, he is the head coach of Neman Grodno.

He played youth football with SDYUSHOR-5.

He graduated from the Belarusian State University majoring in physical culture in 1990.

Honours

As player
Belshina Bobruisk
 Belarusian Cup winner: 1996–97, 1998–99

As coach
Naftan Novopolotsk
 Belarusian Cup winner: 2008–09, 2011–12

References

External links
 Bio at pressball.by

1968 births
Living people
Sportspeople from Brest, Belarus
Soviet footballers
Belarusian footballers
Association football defenders
Belarusian expatriate footballers
Expatriate footballers in Russia
Expatriate footballers in Azerbaijan
Russian Premier League players
FC Molodechno players
FC Luch Vladivostok players
FC Dynamo Brest players
FC Dnepr Mogilev players
FC Tyumen players
FC Belshina Bobruisk players
FC Gomel players
FC Neman Grodno players
FC Slavia Mozyr players
Khazar Lankaran FK players
Belarusian football managers
FC Naftan Novopolotsk managers
FC Neman Grodno managers